The Shah Mosque, also known as the  Soltāni Mosque meaning "royal", renamed the Imam Mosque, after the 1979 Iranian Revolution, is a principal mosque in the northern section of the Grand Bazaar in Tehran, Iran.

Structure 
The Mosque was built to the order of Fath-Ali Shah Qajar of Persia during the Qajar period, as one of several such symbols of legitimacy for the new dynasty. At the time of completion, the mosque was considered to be the most significant architectural monument in Tehran.

During the reign of Naser al-Din Shah Qajar, the two current minarets were added to the structure. The mosque is topped by a small gilt dome. The mosque also has two Shabestan.

The courtyard is accessed from several parts of the Grand Bazaar, the commercial heart of the capital. There are some significant architectural similarities between the Shah Mosque, the Vakil Mosque in Shiraz, and the Royal Mosque in Borujerd.
The Shah Mosque  is located in Tehran, Iran. It is recognized to be one of the most gorgeous creations of the Persian empire in the Islamic era. The construction of the mosque began from 1611 and was successfully completed in 1629. Built during the Qajar era under the ruler Naser al-Din Shah Qajar, the Shah Mosque serves as a symbol of excellence in the Islamic era. The architectural mastermind behind it all is Ali-Akhbar Isfahani. His innovative way of thinking led him to having an inscription of his name in the mosque above the doorway. The Shah Mosque  is intricately detailed with 18 million bricks and 475,000 tiles. They incorporated the seven color style of tile mosaic to amplify the beauty of the exterior.

The breathtakingly beautiful Shah Mosque is a popular tourist attraction. Millions of visitors will come to Tehran to witness the beauty of the mosque in person. It's vibrant interior will take anyone's breathe away. The geographical and historical elements behind this structure do` not coincide with the axis of Mecca. The intention was to create the mosque to be visible from any angle in the Naqsh-e-Jahan square. Therefore, it stands as the center of attention. In such a prosperous city of Tehran, the area thrives with an abundance of culture and rich history.

Notable events

On December 11, 1905, the vāli of Tehran ordered the public flogging of 17 prominent merchants of the Bazaar in the main courtyard of the Shah Mosque, blaming them for the increase in the price of sugar. The public humiliation of the merchants was condemned by the Bazaaris and in protest, the Grand Bazaar shut its doors.  A public backlash against the government in a series of related incidents ignited the Persian Constitutional Revolution.

On March 7, 1951, Haj Ali Razmara, anti-communist Prime Minister of Iran, was attending the memorial service for Ayatollah Feyz at the Shah Mosque. On his way to the mosque, he was shot dead in the mosque's grand courtyard by Khalil Tahmasebi, who was described as a "religious fanatic" by The New York Times.  According to the Encyclopædia Britannica, Tahmasebi was a member of the Shiite activist group "Fedaʾeyān-e Eslām (Persian: 'Self-Sacrificers of Islam'), an extremist religious organization with close ties to the traditional merchant class and the clergy."  In 1952, Tahmasebi was freed and pardoned by the Iranian Parliament during the premiership of Mosaddegh, and he was declared a Soldier of Islam.  Following the 1953 Iranian coup d'état, Tahmasebi was re-arrested and tried; he was executed in 1955.

Gallery

References

External links

Mosques in Tehran
National works of Iran
19th-century establishments in Iran
Buildings of the Qajar period